Prince Henri Florent Eugène François Joseph Lamoral de Ligne (29 December 1881 – 15 May 1967) was a Belgian nobleman, the son of Prince Charles Joseph Eugène Henri Georges Lamoral (1837–1914) (himself the son of Prince Eugène, 8th Prince of Ligne and his wife Nathalie de Trazegnies) and Charlotte de  (1854–1933), (herself the daughter of Étienne Charles de Gontaut, Marquis of Biron).

Family
He married Princess Charlotte de La Trémoïlle (eldest daughter of Prince Louis Charles Marie de La Trémoille, 10th Duke of Thouars and his wife Hélène Marie Léonie Pillet-Will) and they had one son, Prince Jean Charles Lamoral.

In 1933, upon the accidental death of his wife’s childless younger brother, Prince Louis Jean Marie de La Trémoille, 11th Duke of Thouars, Prince Henri-Florent Lamoral became The Duke of Thouars as spouse of the now 12th Duchess, a title which was last held in the female form by his mother-in-law Princess Hélène, The Dowager Duchess of Thouras.

Descendants
Prince Henri Florent Eugène François Joseph Lamoral de Ligne. (1881-1967)
  Prince Jean Charles Lamoral of Ligne-La Trémoïlle (1911-2005)
 Princess Hedwige de Ligne (1943-),married Charles-Guillaume, Prince de Merode, Marquis van Westerloo. (1940-)	
 Prince Emmanuel de Merode.
Charles-Antoine, Prince de Ligne-La Trémoïlle

References

External links

|-

1881 births
1967 deaths
Belgian noble princes
Henri Florent Lamoral
French nobility
House of La Trémoille